Zimbabwe Parks and Wildlife Management Authority (Zimparks) is an agency of the Zimbabwe government managing national parks. Zimbabwe's game reserves are managed by the government. They were initially founded as a means of using unproductive land.

History 
The first proclaimed game reserve was Wankie (now Hwange), formed in 1928 and upgraded in the 1949 National Parks Act. The then-Rhodesia's game section was originally formed in 1952 as a subsidiary of the Department of Mines, Lands and Surveys. This was the nucleus that became the Department of National Parks and Wildlife Management in 1964.

The Parks and Wildlife Act of 1975 established the agency. It was a quintessential breakthrough for conservation. The attitude of people towards wildlife underwent a profound change. Under the act, ownership of wildlife passed from the state to whoever owned the land the animal lived on.

When the landowners (both communal and private) became custodians of the wildlife, a change in mindset occurred. People began to see their wildlife resources as an asset to be nurtured, ensuring their benefits continued into the future. Gradually, fence-breaking elephant and zebra were not viewed as nuisances to be eradicated; herds of impala were no longer a quick, easy meal.

Within the Parks and Wildlife Act, various levels were defined at which state-owned land was to be protected and utilised. Gone was the old Game Department that issued hunting licences which, for a nominal fee, allowed settlers to hunt wildlife in all areas but a few game reserves. A system of national parks, botanical reserves and gardens, sanctuaries, recreational parks and safari areas was set firmly in place. Since 1975, the act has been amended and refined, allowing the evolution of a dynamic wildlife-protection process.

Many African countries have since adopted this philosophy. So far-reaching was the concept of the original act that it now enshrines many aspects of grassroots conservation being implemented worldwide. Communal or traditional tribal areas and privately owned land were also categorised for different levels of utilisation.

Communal areas harbouring significant wildlife resources or bordering national parks were given Appropriate Authority status through their Rural Councils, and as a result the Communal Areas Management Programme for Indigenous Resources was born. CAMPFIRE has developed into an important conservation strategy, ensuring that significant financial earnings revert to rural communities for their benefit. This philosophy has been adopted on a pan-African basis and is slowly being implemented in Asia and South America as well.

Many of Zimbabwe's national parks, such as Victoria Falls, Mana Pools and Hwange, are renowned worldwide, though the country also has lesser-known gems such as Chizarira and Gonarezhou. Parts of the Rhodes Estate, established in Rhodes' will of 1902, were bequeathed to the nation for farming, forestry and agricultural research. This land later became part of the rocky Matobo and mountainous Nyanga National Parks.

Current peace parks 
 Chimanimani Transfrontier Conservation Area
 Great Limpopo Transfrontier Park
 Greater Mapungubwe Transfrontier Conservation Area

Future peace parks 
 Kavango - Zambezi Transfrontier Conservation Area

Current national parks 
Chimanimani National Park
Chizarira National Park
Gonarezhou National Park
Hwange National Park
Kazuma Pan National Park
Mana Pools National Park
Matobo National Park
Matusadona National Park
Nyanga National Park, which incorporates Mutarazi Falls National Park
Victoria Falls National Park
Zambezi National Park

Current recreational parks 
 Bangala Dam Recreational Park
 Chinhoyi Caves Recreational Park
 Insiza Dam Recreational Park, also known as Mayfair Dam and Lake Cunningham
 Kavira Hot Springs Recreational Park, near Mlibizi
 Lake Chivero Recreational Park (formerly McIlwaine)
 Lake Kariba Recreational Park
 Lake Manyame (formerly Darwendale) Recreational Park
 Lake Mutirikwe (formerly Kyle) Recreational Park
 Manjirenji Dam Recreational Park
 Lake Matopos Recreational Park
 Mupfure (formerly Umfuli) Recreational Park
 Mzingwane Dam Recreational Park
 Ngezi Recreational Park
 Sebakwe Recreational Park
 MBIZI Recreational Park

Current sanctuaries 
 Chimanimani Eland Sanctuary
 Manjinji Pan Sanctuary
 Mbazhe Pan Sanctuary
 Mushandike Sanctuary
 Nyamaneche Sanctuary
 Tshabalala Sanctuary

Current safari areas 
 Charara Safari Area
 Chegutu Safari Area (formerly Hartley A)
 Chete Safari Area
 Chewore Safari Area
 Chipinge Safari Area
 Chirisa Safari Area
 Dande Safari Area
 Deka Safari Area
 Doma Safari Area
 Hurungwe Safari Area
 Malipati Safari Area
 Matetsi Safari Area
 Sapi Safari Area
 Sibilobilo Safari Area
 Thuli Safari Area

Botanical gardens and reserves 
 Bunga Forest Botanical Reserve
 Chisekera Hot Springs Botanical Reserve
 Ewanrigg Botanical Garden 
 Haroni Forest Botanical Reserve
 Mazoe Botanical Reserve
 Mwari Raphia Palm Botanical Reserve
 National Botanic Garden
 Pioneer Botanical Reserve
 Rusitu Forest Botanical Reserve
 Sebakwe Acacia Karoo Botanical Reserve
 Sebakwe Great Dyke Botanical Reserve
 Sebakwe Mountain Acacia Botanical Reserve
 South Camp Botanical Reserve
 Tingwa Rafia Palm Botanical Reserve
 Tolo River Botanical Reserve
 Vumba Botanical Gardens and Reserve

References

External links

Zimbabwe
 
Parks
Government of Zimbabwe